The Never Summer Wilderness is a U.S. Wilderness Area located immediately west of Rocky Mountain National Park in the Never Summer Mountains of Arapaho National Forest in northern Colorado.

References

Wilderness areas of Colorado
Protected areas established in 1980
Protected areas of Grand County, Colorado
Protected areas of Jackson County, Colorado
Arapaho National Forest
Routt National Forest
1980 establishments in Colorado